is a Japanese manga series by Satoshi Urushihara which was serialized in Monthly Magazine Z published by Kodansha.

Plot synopsis

The story is set from before the dawn of time, since which people (identified as Crimsons) have been under control of a deadly foe (identified as Clients), who considers themselves gods. At the end of the 20th century, the Crimsons still fall under the domain of the Clients, powerful beings who survive by making sacrificial offerings of live human people.

The protagonist is Shion, a child who is half-Client and half-Crimson, i.e. a vampire. He has chosen to fight ceaselessly against the Clients. He is aided by  his companion, Rain, a human girl who acts not only as his ally, but also as his source of nourishment and lover. During a mission, Shion meets Helen, a young girl whose family fell victim to the Clients. He makes a blood oath and takes Helen as one of his followers.

Characters
Shion

Shion was born in the home world of the Clients, but his human mother escaped with him through a portal created by Shion's father.  His mother was later killed by the Clients. As a vampire, Shion cannot sustain himself on normal food, but must instead drink the blood of others.  Shion has a pair of black wings that he keeps folded up in his back until needed.  He can also turn his nails into claws, and his eyes become cat-like at times.  While Shion is half-Client in his biological nature, his actions constantly defy this.  The Clients see humans as cattle and have no qualms with raping them.  Shion, by contrast, devotes himself only to protecting humans and truly loves Rain and Helen, only drinking their blood when he needs it and giving them true affection when he makes love to them.

Rain

Rain is Shion's first companion since childhood, and his weapon. Rain can transform into armor with special abilities to help Shion in battle. Despite being several years older than Shion, Rain is deeply in love with him and quickly becomes jealous when Shion meets or has to help other women, though she ultimately goes along with his decisions. She also enjoys shopping.

Helen

Helen was orphaned by the Clients and was raised by a church minister.  She first met Shion and Rain by accident when the pair were looking for hospitality.  She fell in love with Shion but was too shy to act on her feelings.  Later, the Clients gained control of her and used her to try to kill Shion.  Helen wounded Shion, but regained her senses and offered Shion her blood.  She is now Shion's companion with Rain.Like Rain, Helen can turn into armor for Shion, but does not yet have as many abilities as Rain does. Helen also has the power to detect Clients and their minions, and has an exceptionally beautiful singing voice.

Publication
The manga is published in French by Pika Edition, in Spanish by Planetacomic, in German and Italian by Panini Comics.

In 2002, Germany's Federal Department for Media Harmful to Young Persons classified the story as "endangering" due to the violence and sex scenes in the manga.  A censored edition is sold called "Vampire Master", which is restricted to 16 and over, and an uncensored edition for people over 18 is sold as "Dark Crimson".

Chapter list

The Angel of the Red Death.
Death on the Possessed City.
The Banquet of the Gods of the Darkness.
Invitation for the Darkness.
The Blue Tear Fang.
The Black Wing Knight.
The Mansion of the Sacrifices.
Agreement of Blood.
Towards the Promised Land.

Reception

Manga-News considers the story to be "secondary" to the art in the manga, and the fanservice in the second volume to be over the top, finding the second volume "not worth the money", calling the series "an excuse to show erotic art" and recommending the series as a whole only for fans of the author's art.

References

External links

Hentai anime and manga
2000 manga
Seinen manga